Adolph Kullak (23 February 1823 – 25 December 1862) was a German pianist and music writer.

Life 
Born in Międzyrzecz, Kullak, the brother of the founder of the New Academy of Music, Theodor Kullak, is still significant today through his writings on music theory. His main works are Das Musikalisch-Schöne, ein Beitrag zur Ästhetik der Tonkunst and Die Ästhetik des Klavierspiels. (1860). He also worked as a piano teacher and as an author for the Neue Berliner Musikzeitung.

Kullack died in Berlin at the age of 39.

References

External links 
 
 

19th-century German musicologists
German classical pianists
1823 births
1862 deaths